Patterson Peak is a peak, 1,610 m, standing at the south end of Medina Peaks, 4 nautical miles (7 km) northwest of Anderson Ridge, in the Queen Maud Mountains of Antarctica. Mapped by United States Geological Survey (USGS) from ground surveys and U.S. Navy air photos, 1960–64. Named by Advisory Committee on Antarctic Names (US-ACAN) for Clair C. Patterson, glaciologist at Byrd Station, summer 1965–66.

Mountains of the Ross Dependency
Amundsen Coast